The Wood-Ridge School District is a comprehensive community public school district serving students in pre-kindergarten through twelfth grade from Wood-Ridge in Bergen County, New Jersey, United States.

As of the 2018–19 school year, the district, comprising three schools, had an enrollment of 1,282 students and 98.0 classroom teachers (on an FTE basis), for a student–teacher ratio of 13.1:1.

The district is classified by the New Jersey Department of Education as being in District Factor Group "FG", the fourth-highest of eight groupings. District Factor Groups organize districts statewide to allow comparison by common socioeconomic characteristics of the local districts. From lowest socioeconomic status to highest, the categories are A, B, CD, DE, FG, GH, I and J.

For ninth through twelfth grades, students from Moonachie attend Wood-Ridge High School, as part of a sending/receiving relationship with the Moonachie School District.

Schools 
Schools in the district (with 2018–19 enrollment data from the National Center for Education Statistics) are:
Elementary school
Catherine E. Doyle Elementary School with 400 students in Pre-K through 3rd grade
Lara Schmitt, Principal
Middle school
Wood-Ridge Intermediate School with 249 students in grades 4–6
Keith Lisa, Principal
High school
Wood-Ridge Junior/Senior High School  with 583 students in grades 7–12
Benjamin Suro, Principal
Marc Sinclair, Assistant Principal/Athletic Director
Silvia Raguseo-Ruiz, Assistant Principal/Director of Secondary Curriculum

Administration 
Core members of the district's administration are:
Anthony Albro, Superintendent of Schools
Jenine Murray, Business Administrator / Board Secretary
Paula Hill, Director of Special Services

Board of education
The district's board of education, with five members, sets policy and oversees the fiscal and educational operation of the district through its administration. As a Type II school district, the board's trustees are elected directly by voters to serve three-year terms of office on a staggered basis, with either one or two seats up for election each year held (since 2014) as part of the November general election. The board appoints a superintendent to oversee the day-to-day operation of the district. A sixth trustee is appointed by the Moonachie School District to represent its interests on the Wood-Ridge board.

References

External links 
Wood-Ridge School District

School Data for the Wood-Ridge School District, National Center for Education Statistics

Wood-Ridge, New Jersey
New Jersey District Factor Group FG
School districts in Bergen County, New Jersey